The Nimmo Twins are a sketch comedy duo from Norfolk, UK comprising Owen Evans and Karl Minns.  First working together in 1996 in Norwich, they came to national attention after their show Posh Spice Nude was a sell-out success at the 1997 Edinburgh Festival, and 
they became regulars on Radio 4's Loose Ends programme with Ned Sherrin.  The duo returned to Edinburgh in 1998 and 1999, and have performed internationally.

Career

Owen Evans was raised in Cromer and attended the London Academy of Music and Dramatic Art (LAMDA) where he studied with the Moscow Arts Theatre school. As an actor, he has appeared in innumerable plays and theatre productions. He has also appeared in television adverts for Daewoo Cars, NatWest, Ikea and Flora.

As a stand-up comedian, Karl Minns won the Daily Telegraph Open Mic Award in 2001 and played the Montreal and Melbourne Comedy Festivals before returning to Edinburgh in 2002 in Comedy Clone with Nina Conti and Patrick Monaghan. The Nimmo Twins then became the face of Adnams Beer in Norfolk in TV radio and billboard adverts for two years.

The Twins got their start with the Crude Apache Theatre Company. After their 1997 Edinburgh Festival show they made appearances on BBC One's Stand Up Show.

Minns has written plays, comedies and musicals for both stage and radio. As a television writer he has written for Karen Taylor, Laura Solon and Phil Nichol. He wrote the TV sitcom pilot Moonmonkeys starring Karl Theobald and Dan Antopoloski. He also wrote a weekly column for the Norwich Evening News from 2002 to 2007. He was awarded the EDF Regional Columnist of The Year in January 2007. He was also nominated for the Press Gazette Media Awards Regional Columnist of the year in the same year.

The Nimmo Twins briefly expanded to a trio in 1999 with the introduction of Andrew McGibbon, who performed with them during the spring and summer of that year.

The first Radio 4 comedy series The Nimmo Twins in... was broadcast in 2000 on BBC 7. Episodes included: A Stiff Upper Lip - a tale of a Victorian era gentleman without a beard; and Lord of the Onion Rings - the tale of a Tolkien-obsessed man who works in a petrol station.  Their second series, The Rapid Eye Movement, about the troupe of actors performing a man's nightly dreams, starred Martin Freeman, Chris Langham and Kevin Eldon. The show ran for three series until 2005. The second series was nominated for the Douglas Adams Award for Radio Comedy in 2003.

Minns wrote the show Mouth to Mouth, for BBC3, a series of six interlinking monologues, whose stories intersected until the whole overall story was told.  The Stage described it as an "intricately-plotted love hexagon... superb and understated".

As a writer and performer, Minns has also contributed to two series of Russell Howard's Good News on BBC3, credited as Programme Associate alongside Dan Atkinson and Steve Williams. The first series aired in winter 2009, the second series ran from March to May 2010. The programme is now in its seventh series with Minns now credited as writer. Minns is also credited as a writer on Spitting Image (2020).

Live shows
In their native Norfolk, Evans and Minns are best known for their yearly sketch show, Normal for Norfolk, which in ten years grew from a pub show to a performance at the Norwich Playhouse, playing to over 4500 people over Christmas 2005.

In the early hours of 14 December 2007, Karl Minns was attacked while walking home after a performance at the city's Playhouse. He was badly injured, suffering a broken arm and fractured skull. The duo were forced to cancel the remainder of their shows for the year.

References

People from Norwich
English male comedians
BBC Radio comedy programmes
Living people
Year of birth missing (living people)